Nydelige nelliker (The Misfits) is a Norwegian comedy film from 1964, directed by Knut Andersen. The screenplay was written by Bjørn Bergh-Pedersen, who based it on Egil Lian's novel Drevne karer og viltre jenter på strøket (Shrewd Guys and Wild Girls in the Neighborhood). Knut Andersen and Knut Bohwim edited the shooting script.

Plot
Lerka and his two sidekicks Slegga and Proffen have been convicted of cheating people out of money and housing fraud. When they are released from prison after six months, they realize that it is not easy to get work after "graduating" from the Oslo Penitentiary. Society does its part to undermine the good intentions of the "misfits," including Dråpan, who has stopped drinking and has been given a painting job by Colonel Ruud and his wife. His thirst—and a thoughtlessly poured glass of liqueur—are enough to drive him off the wagon. Nelly—who is working the Oslo City Hall neighborhood—gets the upper hand over Harald Drangeid. With the help of the money in his well-stocked wallet, Lerka realizes his dream of buying a boat. Lerka's girlfriend Maja is hauled off to jail at the same time as her boyfriend is released.

Cast

Arve Opsahl as Slegga
Odd Borg as Lerka
Erik Lassen as Proffen
Arvid Nilssen as Dråpan
Ingerid Vardund as Nelly
Vigdis Røising as Maja
Kari Simonsen as Lizzie
Willie Hoel as Gjermund Sillejord
Siri Rom as Mrs. Thorvaldsen
Tore Foss as Colonel Ruud
Else Heiberg as Mrs. Ruud
Henki Kolstad as Harald Drangeid
Torgils Moe as Store-Jens
Ove Kant as Per Albertson
Carsten Byhring as the boat salesman
Leif Enger as the hairdresser
Aud Schønemann as the hairdresser's fiancé
Sverre Holm as Harry
Hans Stormoen as the sales manager
Rolf Søder as Lieutenant Sem
Per Hagerup as Lieutenant Viker
Dagmar Myhrvold as Maja's friend
Sigrun Otto as the milk lady
Per Gjersøe as the district court judge
Erling Lindahl as the actor
Ola Isene as the trial judge
Lars Nordrum as the narrator
Per Skift

References

External links
 
 Nydelige nelliker at the National Library of Norway

1964 films
Norwegian comedy films
1964 comedy films
Films directed by Knut Andersen